The Great Debate is a Canadian television series that featured debates between pairs of panelists over a given subject. It was first shown on Global Television Network in 1974, and later broadcast by CHCH-TV from Hamilton, Ontario. The series was produced intermittently until 1983.

Format
Pierre Berton was the host and moderator of a televised debate between two guests who argued about a given proposition. A studio audience of approximately 200 people voted for or against the proposition at the start of the program, and again at the end after the debate to gauge the influence of the debators' arguments.

Production
The Great Debate was produced by My Country Productions, co-owned by series producer Elsa Franklin and Berton.

It was one of the first series broadcast on the fledgling Global Television Network. However, the broadcaster encountered financial distress within months of its debut and owed My Country Productions $48,000. Global offered unsecured creditors such as program producers a short-term 25% payment. Berton, however, proceeded to pay guest debators personally, in full for their appearance and travel.

Global renewed The Great Debate for a second season beginning late 1974. CHCH-TV picked up The Great Debate from Global for its third, 1975-76 season, and aired these in the Tuesday 10 p.m. time slot.

Episodes

1974: first season

1974-75: second season

These episodes were listed as broadcast on Global Television, broadcast
Thursdays and repeated Sundays.

1975-76: third season

These episodes are listed as broadcast on the series new flagship station, CHCH-TV, Tuesdays at 10 p.m.

1976-77: fourth season

The series was broadcast on CHCH-TV on Fridays at 8 p.m. Topics in this season included apartheid and lotteries.

1977-83: later episodes

The following episodes are on file with Library and Archives Canada:

Reception
During its initial month, The Great Debate gained a 3% share of the BBM television ratings, competing unfavourably to CTV which earned a 31% share for The Streets of San Francisco. By mid-1974, the show's ratings increased to 201,000 viewers from 106,000 within a three-week span.

References

External links
 
 

1970s Canadian television talk shows
Global Television Network original programming
1974 Canadian television series debuts
1983 Canadian television series endings
1980s Canadian television talk shows